are a group of about 350 Japanese prose narratives written primarily in the Muromachi period (1392–1573).  These illustrated short stories, which remain unattributed, together form one of the representative literary genres of the Japanese medieval era.

Overview 
 is a general term for narrative literature written between the Muromachi period (approximately 1336–1573) and the beginning of the Edo period (1603–1867). It later came to denote other works of the same genre and period.

List
The 23 tales covered by the narrow definition are:

Most are around 30–40 pages in length, and are of uncertain date. Their authors are also largely unknown, but whereas Heian and Kamakura  were almost all composed by members of the aristocracy, these works were composed by not just aristocrats but also Buddhist monks, hermits, educated members of the warrior class. Some of the later  may have been written by members of the emerging urban merchant class. They therefore have a wide variety of contents and draw material from various literary works of the past. Based on their contents, scholars have divided them into six genres:

are tales of the aristocracy. They mark a continuation of the earlier  literature, and are noted for the influence of The Tale of Genji. Many of them are rewritten or abridged versions of earlier works.

Categories

Origins of the term  
The term  literally means 'companion', with the full name of the genre translating to 'companion tale'. This designation, however, did not come into use until 1725, when a publisher in Osaka released a set of 23 illustrated booklets titled  (Fortuitous Companion Library).

History of  scholarship 
 came to the attention of modern literary historians in the late 19th century. For the most part, scholars have been critical of this genre, dismissing it for its perceived faults when compared to the aristocratic literature of the Heian and Kamakura periods. Recent studies, however, have contradicted this critical stance, highlighting the vitality and inherent appeal of this underappreciated genre. The term  ('medieval novels'), coined by eminent scholar Ichiko Teiji, attempts to situate the tales within a narrative continuum.

List of  
 
 
 
 
  (I)
  (II)

References

Works cited

Further reading 

 
 Kavanagh, Frederick G. "An Errant Priest. Sasayaki Tale". Monumenta Nipponica, Vol. 51: 219-244. 
 . Accessed 12 Jan. 2023.
 
『室町時代物語大成』. Kadokawa Shoten.
 奥野健男. 『お伽草紙』. 新潮文庫.　
 Skord, Virginia. "Tales of Tears and Laughter: Short Fiction of Medieval Japan", University of Hawaii Press, 1991.
 Skord, Virginia. "Monogusa Tarō: From Rags to Riches and Beyond", Monumenta Nipponica, Vol. 44, 171-198.
 Waters, Virginia Skord. "Sex, Lies and the Illustrated Scroll: The Dojoji Engi Emaki", Monumenta Nipponica, Vol. 52,59-84.

External links 
"Sekai no Dejitaru Nara Ehon Detabesu" at Keiō University
Translations of Classical Japanese Works, Meiji Gakuin University
Online Colored Illustrations edition of the Otogizōshi at Kyoto University Rare Materials Digital Archive (RMDA)

 
Japanese folklore
Late Middle Japanese texts